Kasemrad Sriburin General Hospital or Kasaemrad Hospital is a hospital in Chiang Rai Province in northeast Thailand. It is one of the most important hospitals in the province. It was established in 1993 by the Kasemrad Hospital group which is based in Bangkok.

The hospital is on the main highway (Hwy 1) in the city of Chiang Rai.  It is a full-service hospital operating 24 hours a day with 120 beds. It is capable of providing routine medical care and state-of-the-art services in a variety of specialties.

References

Hospital buildings completed in 1994
Hospitals in Thailand
Buildings and structures in Chiang Rai province
Hospitals established in 1994
1994 establishments in Thailand
Private hospitals in Thailand